A garden railway or garden railroad is a model railway system set up outdoors in a garden. While G is the most popular scale for garden railroads, 16 mm scale has a dedicated and growing following especially in the UK. Model locomotives in this scale are often live steam scale models of British narrow gauge prototypes. 16 mm scale (which runs on ) track, the same gauge as O gauge is probably now more popular in the UK than G scale.

A garden railway's scale tends to be in the range of 1/32 (Gauge 1) to 1/12 (1:12), running on either  or  gauge track. 1/32 scale (1:32) is also called "three-eighths scale" meaning 3/8 of an inch on the model represents one foot on the real thing. For similar reasons, 1/24 scale (1:24) is also called "half-inch scale". Other popular scales are 1:29, 1:20.3 (representing  gauge prototypes on  track, 16 mm (1:19).  They are smaller than the Backyard railroad, or what is commonly called a miniature railway, and would not provide a ride-on facility, being intended instead as a display railway. Smaller scales and gauges are used in the garden, but in general garden railway is used to refer to the medium scale sizes which would be impractical to use indoors.

Function
At its most basic level, a garden railway works just like an indoor railway, including turnouts and turntables. However, special considerations must be taken for everything from sunlight, wind and rain, to dirt and leaves, and even wildlife. The distance covered also means that electrical resistance in and between sections is much higher, and electrical power will tend to drop off at the far end.

To eliminate this power issue, some are rigged to use RC car parts such as rechargeable batteries. Others even use live steam and run as a real steam locomotive would. The steam can be generated from a variety of sources, ranging from messy solid pellet (i.e. methenamine) or sterno-type fuel, through clean-burning butane gas, to prototypical coal burners. Live steam is particularly widespread amongst 16 mm scale garden railway enthusiasts.

Many trains also have digital audio on board, so they sound like a real train. They can also use Digital Command Control or other similar systems, though dirty outdoor track can cause less of a problem with signal than with simple DC power. This is because DCC puts the full voltage on the rails at all times. There are many benefits of DCC when compared to DC analog systems.

Design

Plants are usually an integral part of a garden railway, and dwarf varieties along with pruning are often used to keep them in proper proportion.  Some go so far as to use bonsai techniques, though this can be very time-consuming for large areas.

Buildings are also often used in a garden railway, though they too must be constructed to withstand the weather. Train stations and freight depots are popular, some even building whole towns trackside. The loco shed is a common place to store a locomotive (or the whole train) when not in use.

Other geographic features are used, such as a small pond to represent a lake, rocks for boulders, or tunnels through "mountains" or under stairways. Tunnels can be a particular challenge, because everything from cats to raccoons and more like to hide in them, particularly to get out of the rain or heat, sometimes even to sleep, nest, or hibernate. A derailment inside a tunnel can also be permanent if careful planning is not done to ensure that it can be reached by access panels (trapdoors) or at arm's length from either end.

A frequent theme is the railway in an idealised urban or rural environment, so it is often found in the context of a model village. Some garden railways work opposite to the model village style and opt more for a railway in the garden, where the railways runs amongst normal plants, not in scale with the railway. These sort of railway designs allow for large scale planting and many gardeners have the railway as a secondary hobby to gardening.

Display

Numerous garden rail societies have been formed around the world. Members often invite others over for social gatherings, as well as rotating club meetings around each month. A large setup was on public display at the Atlanta Botanical Garden during the summer and early fall of 2005, including replicas of downtown Atlanta skyscrapers made from wood, bark, and other natural materials.

In Milwaukee, Wisconsin, the Mitchell Park Horticultural Conservatory features an extensive Garden Railway display put on with the cooperation of many Wisconsin Model Railroad club members. The "Domes" as they are known locally, schedules the indoor Garden Railway Show during the cold winter months. It has become one of the most popular displays each year and one of the largest temporary Garden Railway displays in the Midwest.

A notable example in England is Bekonscot which is the oldest model village in the world and has an extensive railway running through a mythical 1930s England. This is well known to be one of the largest, and oldest, garden railways in the UK open to the public.

Many owners name their railways, similar to real railroad lines; some with natural-sounding sames, others with playful or fanciful names.

Technical

Scales

For historical reasons, the situation is complex.

If used to represent  track, this corresponds to a scale of 1:32. This gauge, but not the scale, is derived from the standard gauge 'Gauge 1' in UK (originally using a scale of 10mm to 1 foot).

in many countries i.e. Australia, Africa, corresponds to a scale of 1:24.

This larger scale is increasing in popularity.

This scale is also called 16 mm in UK, where it is mainly found, because it represents 16 mm for 1 ft.

This combination is not common but has a small number of dedicated followers.

A US manufacturer (Aristocraft) decided to create a new scale of 1:29 for standard gauge trains on 45 mm track; filling the need for mass-produced American prototypes in a market otherwise dominated by European outline trains. At the time (1988), 45mm track was the most common track worldwide. The choice of 1:29 was an attempt to create cars and engines that would compare favorably in size with existing LGB rolling stock which dominated the hobby, and to increase the "wow" factor by making the trains 30% larger by volume than standard 1:32 scale trains. In addition 1:29 is exactly three times the size of HO scale making it easier to enlarge existing scale model drawings for consumer construction of accessories and scratch-built engines and rolling stock. Since this original venture, at least two other major companies have joined in the 1:29th market (USA Trains and AML/American Mainline) as well as some other smaller companies creating a wide range of rolling stock and locomotives. Early releases in this scale were more toy like, complete with brass railings and other decorations. Since that time there has been a steady move toward more and more realism with recent releases in live steam radio controlled engines. 1:29 is predominantly American mainline although some locomotives and rolling stock are made for the European market.

If one will represent a modern epoch, there is need for road cars and trucks which are only offered in 1:18, 1:24 and 1:32 scale. Modellers are making compromises and 1:22.5 trains are commonly associated with 1:24 accessories (figures, animals, cars, etc.)

There is a conflict on the designation of 'G' scale (created by LGB), the NMRA was initially willing to use it only for scale 1:22.5 but manufacturers hoping to benefit from the notoriety of the 'G' naming  continue using this reference for scales  1:20.3, 1:24, 1:29, and 1:32. All these scales would more correctly fall under the name of G gauge, referencing the width of the track, rather than G scale, as there are so many scales now claiming to be G. A recent move has been made to separate all the G gauge scales, the primary one being the use of F scale for 1:20.3.

In short:
(width while on scale -> width effectively used)

Scale 1:22.5 is mainly used for narrow gauge equipment and propose a large choice of trains, buildings and accessories (American or European) and allow low radiuses curves, locomotives and cars being shorts.
Scale G64, which is the proper width for standard gauge trains at scale 1:22.5 began to develop in UK, but only with UK trains. Large radiuses are required due to the length of cars.

American or European quality equipment can be found at scale 1:32, at a cost.

There exists a few garden trains at a smaller scale but maintenance is more difficult.

Common radio control methods

Common switches and accessories control methods

See also
Rail transport modelling scales
Backyard railroad — outdoor railways that are large enough to ride on and often cover many acres.
Ridable miniature railways
Children's railway
Gauge 1
G scale
16 mm scale model trains
SE scale
Bekonscot Model Village
Railway of the Prince Imperial

References

External links

 Family Garden Trains' Free Articles for Beginners
Large Scale Central
Garden Railways Magazine
GIRR Many tips about garden railways construction
Greg Elmassian Likewise many tips as above
DCC outdoors DCCWiki article on Garden Railroads with links to using DCC in the garden.
Roundhouse Engineering Co Ltd Manufacturer of live steam locomotives for Garden Railways

Garden railroads
 Elmtree Line Garden Railway
The Train Garden - English version of Gartenzug
Andy's Garden Railway
Guildford Model Engineering Society 16mm Track

Miniature railways
Railway